Haylen is a surname. Notable people with the surname include:

Jo Haylen (born 1980/1981), Australian politician 
Les Haylen (1898–1977), Australian politician, playwright, novelist, and journalist
Wayne Haylen, Australian judge 

English-language surnames